Jack Wells (3 October 1926 – 2 April 2010) was a South African gymnast. He competed at the 1952 Summer Olympics and the 1956 Summer Olympics.

References

1926 births
2010 deaths
South African male artistic gymnasts
Olympic gymnasts of South Africa
Gymnasts at the 1952 Summer Olympics
Gymnasts at the 1956 Summer Olympics
Sportspeople from Bloemfontein